David Glasgow Farragut High School is a secondary school for students in grades 6 through 12 located on Naval Station Rota Spain. DGF High School (also referred to as Rota High School) is a member of the Mediterranean District of the Department of Defense Dependent Schools (DoDDS) operated by the Department of Defense Education Activity.

Academics 
First opened in the Fall of 1958, David Glasgow Farragut School at Rota Naval Station, Spain, consisted of Kindergarten through grade 12.  Since 1975, Rota High School (also known as, David Glasgow Farragut Middle/High School) has been an accredited member of AdvancED (formerly North Central Association). Students complete a minimum of 26 courses and exams in regular and Advanced Placement (AP) classes with an opportunity to obtain college credit. Due to the small size of the school there are many classes which are not offered at the school, to make up for this the school offers virtual classes through what they call DoDEA Virtual School. The virtual classes are mostly run through the website Edgenuity and Schoology.

Extracurricular activities 
The DGF High School mascot and athletic emblem is the Admiral in honor of Adm. David Glasgow Farragut. The school colors are blue, white, and black.

Athletics 
The Admirals compete in a variety of athletic activities at the Division II level and for an opportunity to win DODDS European Championships. Fall sports include: cheerleading, American football, volleyball, golf, and cross country; winter sports include: cheerleading, boys and girls basketball, and wrestling; spring sports include: soccer, softball, and track and field.

Clubs and activities 
Honors Band & Choir, After School Club: Academic Support, Junior National Honor Society, Art Club, Color Guard, Math Counts, Spanish Club, Drama Club, Model US Senate, Student Council, Drill Team & Marksman Team, MS Intramurals, International club, Peer mediation team, Student 2 Student Club, Future Business Leaders of America, National Honor Society, Yearbook, Dungeons and Dragons, Makers Club, Educators Rising (Future Educators of America), GSA Club (Gender and Sexuality Alliance or Gay Straight Alliance), Multicultural Club, and Navy JROTC.

External links 
 

Buildings and structures in the Province of Cádiz
Department of Defense Education Activity
Secondary schools in Spain
International schools in Spain